XHFJ-FM is a radio station in Teziutlán, Puebla, Mexico, broadcasting on 95.1 FM and known as La Ke Buena.

History
XEFJ-AM 680 received its concession on February 20, 1952 and came to air that August. Originally owned by Teodora Matus de Ferraez, it was sold to Radio Teziutlán, S.A. in 1968 and migrated to FM in 2012.

References

Radio stations established in 1952
Radio stations in Puebla
Regional Mexican radio stations
Spanish-language radio stations